"The Scholars" is a poem written by the Irish poet William Butler Yeats.  It was written between 1914 and April 1915, and is included in the 1919 collection The Wild Swans at Coole.

BALD heads forgetful of their sins,   
Old, learned, respectable bald heads   
Edit and annotate the lines   
That young men, tossing on their beds,  
Rhymed out in love’s despair	   
To flatter beauty’s ignorant ear.    
  
They’ll cough in the ink to the world’s end;   	 
Wear out the carpet with their shoes   
Earning respect; have no strange friend;    
If they have sinned nobody knows.   
Lord, what would they say   
Did their Catullus walk that way?

References

Poetry by W. B. Yeats